Tasmin Jay Pepper (born 19 June 1990 in Edenvale) is a South African female racing driver. She is currently a reserve driver in W Series. She is the daughter of former South African Touring Car driver Iain Pepper and older sister of GT racer Jordan Pepper.

Racing record

Career summary

Complete W Series results
(key) (Races in bold indicate pole position) (Races in italics indicate fastest lap)

References

External links

Official website
Profile at Driver Database

South African racing drivers
W Series drivers
People from Edenvale, Gauteng
1990 births
Living people
Sportspeople from Gauteng
Formula BMW Pacific drivers
Formula Ford drivers
Team Meritus drivers
South African female racing drivers